Louga is a city and region of Senegal. The region is located to the northwest part of the country and Louga city is in the northwest of the region - about 50 km inland from the Atlantic coast.

Departments
Louga region is divided into 3 départements:
Kébémer Département
Linguère Département
Louga Département

Geography
Louga is traversed by the northwesterly line of equal latitude and longitude.

See also 
 Dahra

References

 
Regions of Senegal